The golden age of baseball, or baseball's Golden Era, is the period from about 1920 to 1960. The golden era is the time period immediately following the dead-ball era (before World War I) but prior to what is now called the modern era. There is no exact timeframe in any of these eras.  MLB considers the post World War II era to be the beginning of the modern age, which places the golden era between the end of World War I and the end of World War II.

Much of baseball's golden age was captured in black and white film, adding to the mystique and folklore of the game.  The first baseball game broadcast in color was on August 11, 1951, and by the mid-1960s all baseball games were broadcast in color, which could be viewed as the end of the golden age.

Players
The golden age was dominated by stars such as Lou Gehrig, Ted Williams, Hank Greenberg, Rogers Hornsby and especially Babe Ruth, whose called shot was one of the defining moments of the era.  Another defining moment of the golden era was Gabby Hartnett's Homer in the Gloamin'.  By 1919, when Ruth hit a then-league record 29 home runs, a spectacular feat at that time, the dead-ball era had officially come to an end, ushering in the Live-ball era.

While the most popular icons of the golden era are hitters, and Ruth is generally thought of as one of the premier sports icons in history, there were also several pitchers who dominated hitters on the mound during that same time, and two of the best of them were Lefty Grove and Dizzy Dean, both of whom won over 30 games in the early 1930s. Further, some of the most popular players in the Negro National League included names such as Oscar Charleston, Josh Gibson, and Mule Suttles. Later in the era, players such as Willie Mays, Mickey Mantle, Ernie Banks, and pitchers Bob Gibson and Warren Spahn, among others, established themselves as Hall of Famers and ultimately played into the late 1960s and 1970s, providing a bridge between the current era and the golden age.

Teams
From a team perspective, the golden age of baseball (using the years 1918-1964 as a guideline) was dominated by the American League's New York Yankees, who won 29 pennants and 20 World Series titles between 1918 and 1964.  To expound on that figure, in the National League, it took three clubs combined to win 27 pennants (nine each) during that same timeframe, those teams being the St. Louis Cardinals, Brooklyn Dodgers and New York Giants, all of whom were dominant in their own right.  In addition, the N.L.'s Chicago Cubs tallied 6 N.L. pennants (none until 2016) and the A.L.'s Detroit Tigers snared four A.L. pennants during that same time, the second highest total in the junior circuit after the Bronx Bombers' historic 29.

Teams travelled primarily by train during the period, occasionally stopping off at saloons and speakeasies in between games, mingling with fans and adding to the mystique of the era, as this is unlikely to happen often today.  Many players also worked other "primary" jobs in the offseason, and others stepped away in the middle of their careers to serve in the military.

Entire franchises were worth hundreds of thousands of dollars, at the time, with the Cleveland Indians becoming the first team to be sold for over $1,000,000 when Bob Hope and Bill Veeck bought the club for $1.6 million.

Baseball during the Great Depression 
The Wall Street Crash of 1929 ushered in the Great Depression, and baseball, along with many other businesses, organizations, and families, was severely hit. The popularity and prosperity of the sport had been jeopardized, as well as the prosperity of the U.S. economy. People were struggling to get by, and purchasing tickets just to watch a sports game seemed unreasonable. Because of this ticket sales decreased about 40%. Further, the Depression not only impacted ticket sales and the number of fans at games, but it also dramatically impacted the players. While the sport of baseball continued to be played during the 1930s, there were still many athletes that lost their jobs or received pay cuts, including Babe Ruth. The repercussions of the Great Depression were evident in the salaries of American ball players until after World War II. They dropped about 20% on average, and were not brought back up to their original standards for a number of years after the stock market crash.

Color line in the golden age 
By the time America reached the beginning of the 20th century, nearly all black Americans had been shut out from playing any sort of baseball with white Americans. However, this didn't stop them from creating a league where they get to play themselves. Eventually, black Americans created their own league where persons of color could participate. In the early 1900s the Negro National League grew in popularity, despite the fact that white booking agents often had control over when and where the teams would be able to play or practice. The NNL came to an end due to the financial burdens of the Great Depression, but rearose soon after as the Negro American League.

In 1947, Jackie Robinson was the first African American to be integrated into the previously all white world of baseball. Formerly having played for the Kansas City Monarchs of the NAL, a man named Branch Rickey, president of the Brooklyn Dodgers, sought Robinson as a perfect candidate to finally break the baseball color line. Robinson was still a target of many racist comments and slurs during his time in the majors. Despite this, Jackie Robinson was inducted into the Baseball Hall of Fame in 1962.

Women in baseball 
The very first women's baseball game where girls were paid and prospectors paid admission took place in Illinois in 1875. However, many were unimpressed with the women's abilities while playing baseball. During this time, many Americans didn't see women as being athletes or as major participants in sports. In fact, even in the beginning of the 1900s, people opposed women in all sports because they were afraid that sports would ultimately destroy women's femininity. American perspectives on women at this time were that they were meant to be viewed as perfect and feminine, and many thought that for a woman to participate in such physical activities and sports would make them become more masculine.

Women's baseball began to be taken more seriously at the start of World War II. Philip K. Wrigley, the owner of the Chicago Cubs, decided to invest in an all women's baseball league that went by the AAGPBL (All-American Girls Professional Baseball League) in 1943. Wrigley was worried about losing a good number of male ball players due to the war, he believed that creating a women's league would keep the flow of money coming in from the ball parks. Despite the changing views of Americans towards what women should and should not be able to do in sports, they were still held to a higher caliber of femininity and perfection at this time. Women that played the sport were required to take classes on how to be feminine after practices and games, and were often looked down upon for demonstrating any masculine traits. Nonetheless, this league still opened up opportunities for future women in sports.

See also
Damn Yankees
1918–1964
Baseball color line
Roger Maris

References

Baseball genres
Baseball
Nostalgia in the United States
History of Major League Baseball